Sonat, Inc., headquartered in Birmingham, Alabama, was a large Fortune 500 American energy holding company. The company was founded in 1928 and was listed on the New York Stock Exchange under the ticker symbol "SNT". Sonat was primarily involved in transmission and marketing natural gas and oil and gas exploration and production. The company was also involved in contract offshore drilling until 1995 when the offshore business became Transocean. In 1999 Sonat merged with El Paso Corporation. The company was headquartered in the AmSouth-Sonat Tower in downtown Birmingham.

History

Southern Natural Gas Corporation, 1928-1970s
Sonat was founded in Birmingham, Alabama, as Southern Natural Gas Corporation in 1928. In 1953, the company spun off its natural gas utility division, forming Birmingham-based Alabama Gas Corporation. During the 1960s, the company changed its name to Southern Natural Resources, Inc. In 1968, the company expanded into forestry by creating Southern Forest Products, Inc.

Southern Natural Industries, Inc., 1970s-1980s
In 1972, the company moved into its new 30-story corporate headquarters in downtown Birmingham. The building, called the First National-Southern Natural Building and later the AmSouth-Sonat Tower, was equally owned by and occupied with First National Bank of Birmingham. In 1973, the company changed its name again to Southern Natural Industries, Inc. The company, which was quickly expanding, acquired The Offshore Company in 1978 and soon changed the name to Sonat Offshore (Transocean).

Sonat Inc., 1980s-1999
By the 1980s, Southern Natural had diversified into many different industries. In 1982, the company decided to change its name to Sonat Inc., to create a better known identity in the energy industry. During this time, the company, which had 1981 revenues of $2.4 billion, was ranked as one of the largest companies in the U.S. The company was also ranked as the largest pipeline producer by Forbes. On March 27, 1986, the company expanded its pipeline division by acquiring 50% of Citrus Corporation, which owned Florida Gas Transmission, for $360 million in cash. Later the next year Sonat Marketing was formed to market and sell natural gas. By the end of the 1980s, the company was a leader in natural gas pipeline distribution, exploration and production, and offshore drilling.

In 1993, the company's Sonat Offshore division was spun off as Sonat Offshore Drilling, Inc. In June 1995, the company sold its remaining stake in Sonat Offshore division to stockholders. On November 23, 1997, Sonat expanded its Exploration and Production division by acquiring Zilkha Energy for $1.3 billion.

Merger with El Paso

In March 1999, Sonat announced it was merging with El Paso Corporation in a $6 billion deal in an effort for El Paso to maintain competition in the natural gas markets. At the time of the merger, Sonat was a Fortune 500 company. The E&P unit, Sonat Exploration Company, was blended into El Paso's organization, and the gas transmission unit, Southern Natural Gas Company, is still headquartered in the Birmingham area.

Sonat divisions
Sonat Inc.'s corporate headquarters and several of its divisions were located in Birmingham, Alabama, in the AmSouth-Sonat Tower. Sonat also had offices in Houston, Oklahoma City, Washington D.C., New York City, and London. By 1999, the company's divisions consisted of natural gas distribution, natural gas marketing, and exploration and production.

Southern Natural Gas Company
Southern Natural Gas Company, headquartered in Birmingham, Alabama, was Sonat's natural gas transmission division. The division owned the Sea Robin Pipeline and 50% of Florida Gas Transmission. Sonat sold the Sea Robin Pipeline in 1999 as a requirement to complete its merger with El Paso. After being acquired by El Paso in 1999, Southern Natural continued to operate as a separate division and kept its corporate headquarters in the AmSouth-Sonat Tower until 2007, when it relocated to the Colonial Brookwood Center located in a suburb of Birmingham.

Publicly owned El Paso Pipeline Partners, which is majority owned by El Paso Corp., owns 60% of the company, with El Paso Corp. owning the remaining 40%.

Sonat Marketing
Sonat Marketing was headquartered in Birmingham, Alabama, and was primarily engaged in the marketing of natural gas. The company also operated Sonat Power Marketing which marketed and sold electrical power.

Sonat Exploration
Sonat Exploration Company, headquartered in Houston, Texas, was the exploration and production division of Sonat. The company had regional offices in Fort Smith, Arkansas, Shreveport, Louisiana, Oklahoma City, Oklahoma, and Houston and Tyler, Texas. As a result of the merger with El Paso, the regional offices were closed and the holdings were blended into El Paso's Exploration and Production division.

Former divisions

Sonat Offshore/Transocean
Sonat Offshore was formed in 1953 by Southern Natural Gas when it established The Offshore Company to own mobile jackup rigs in the Gulf of Mexico. The company's name was changed to Sonat Offshore Drilling in 1982. In 1993, Sonat took Sonat Offshore public. Sonat fully divested itself of Sonat Offshore in 1995. In 1996, Sonat Offshore acquired Norwegian Transocean ASA and decided to adopt the name Transocean Offshore in order to differentiate itself from its former parent company. Today Transocean is one of the largest offshore drilling contractors in the world.

Sonat Marine
Sonat Marine was formed in 1981 when Sonat purchased Interstate Oil Transportation Company of Philadelphia, Pennsylvania for $109 million. Interstate had been the nation's largest independent marine transporter of petroleum products. In 1987, a group of Sonat Marine executives and managers formed a partnership to acquire the company from Sonat for $234 million.

References

External links
 Sonat, Inc. FundingUniverse

Natural gas companies of the United States
Defunct companies based in Alabama
Companies based in Birmingham, Alabama
Energy in Alabama
Non-renewable resource companies established in 1928
Non-renewable resource companies disestablished in 1999
1928 establishments in Alabama
1999 disestablishments in Alabama